Dennis Earl Green (February 17, 1949 – July 22, 2016) was an American football coach. During his National Football League (NFL) career, Green coached the Minnesota Vikings for 10 seasons. He coached the Vikings to eight playoff appearances in nine years, despite having seven different starting quarterbacks in those postseasons. He was posthumously inducted into the Minnesota Vikings Ring of Honor in 2018.

Green was the second African American head coach in NFL history. He was the Minnesota Vikings head coach from 1992 to 2001. He was one of the winningest coaches of the 1990s, posting a 97–62 record as Vikings head coach. Green's best season in Minnesota was in 1998, when the Vikings finished 15–1 and set the NFL record for most points in a season at the time; however, the Vikings were upset by the Atlanta Falcons in that year's NFC Championship Game, and Green was unable to reach the Super Bowl throughout his otherwise successful tenure with Minnesota. Following his first losing record in 2001, he was fired just before the final game of the season.

Green was hired by the Cardinals to serve as the head coach for the 2004 season, a franchise then noted for its futility, which had posted only one winning season in a quarter-century. In Arizona, Green was unable to match his success in Minnesota, and his poor win–loss record (16–32) with the Cardinals was similar to that of his predecessors in Arizona. However, many describe Green's tenure with Arizona as an inflection point in the history of the Cardinals, arguing that the culture of the team changed under Green, and that the core of the personnel in the Cardinals' 2008 Super Bowl run was acquired by Green.

Early life
Green grew up in a working class household in Harrisburg, Pennsylvania at the corner of Walnut and N 12th street. In 2019, the 1100 to 1300 block of Walnut Street was renamed "Dennis Green Way" to honor the late native. His father, Penrose "Bus" Green was of Creole descent and worked as a postal worker, he briefly played for the Harrisburg Lions semi-pro football team. Green's mother, Anna Green was a beautician. His father died when Green was 11 and his mother died of breast cancer when he was 13. Green is the youngest of five brothers: Penrose Green, Robert Green, Stanley Green, and Gregory Green. He was in attendance at the March 2, 1962 NBA game in Hershey, Pennsylvania where Wilt Chamberlain scored 100 points. Green has four children: Patti Green (born April 21, 1967), Jeremy Green (born July 21, 1971), Vanessa Green (born February 1, 1997), and Zachary Dennis Green (born November 6, 1998).

Green attended John Harris High School (now Harrisburg High School) in Harrisburg, and graduated cum laude from the University of Iowa with a BA in finance. According to Green, he was planning to be a high school teacher if his football career didn't pan out. In college, he started as halfback in each of his three seasons with the Iowa Hawkeyes, playing under coach Ray Nagel. In his collegiate career, Green had 139 carries for 699 yards and nine touchdowns. His best individual game was in a 1968 loss to Texas Christian University when he rushed 18 times for 175 yards and two touchdowns. After graduating from Iowa, Green briefly played professionally for the BC Lions of the Canadian Football League in 1971.

Assistant coaching career
Green began his football coaching career, returning to the University Iowa in 1972 as a graduate assistant. Green then served as an assistant coach at the University of Dayton (1973), University of Iowa (1974 to 1976) and Stanford University, where he  coached under Bill Walsh in 1977 and 1978. In 1979, Green joined Bill Walsh's staff on the San Francisco 49ers, where he coached special teams. Green returned to Stanford in 1980 as offensive coordinator, coaching with Jim Fassel and Jack Harbaugh.

College coaching career 
In 1981, Green was named the head coach of Northwestern University, a school that had gone 1–31–1 in its last 33 games. In 1981, he was only the second African American head coach in Division I-A history (the previous coach, Willie Jeffries, coached at Wichita State, which no longer has a football team).  Green was named the Big Ten Conference Coach of the Year, as chosen by writers and broadcasters, in 1982 at Northwestern. He left Northwestern in 1985, doing a stint as the wide receivers coach for the San Francisco 49ers under his former boss at Stanford, Bill Walsh. In his last season with the San Francisco 49ers, they reached the 1989 NFL Super Bowl Championship Game, in which Green made the play call that led to John Taylor's 10 yard TD reception from Joe Montana that secured the win with 39 seconds left.

In 1989, Green took the head coaching position at Stanford University, inheriting a team that had graduated 17 of its 21 starters from 1988. Green led the Cardinal from 1989 to 1991. During that time, his teams finished with an overall record of 16–18, a .471 winning percentage, going 3–0 in the Big Game against the California Golden Bears. In 1990, his Stanford team defeated top-ranked Notre Dame in South Bend, Indiana. His tenure culminated with an 8–3 record (Stanford's best since 1986). A loss to Washington in the opening game of the season was the deciding factor for the Pac-10 championship. The Cardinal made an appearance in the 1991 Aloha Bowl, where his team lost to Georgia Tech on a last-minute touchdown.

Professional coaching career

Minnesota Vikings
Green was a disciple of Bill Walsh's West Coast offense and was touted by Walsh and other NFL pundits as a likely candidate to be the second African-American head coach in the NFL. On January 10, 1992, Green was named 5th head coach  of the Minnesota Vikings, replacing the retiring Jerry Burns. The day he was introduced as the Vikings' head coach, he announced that there was a "new sheriff in town". He was the second African American head coach after Art Shell in the modern NFL era, and the first to do so without ever playing in the NFL. Green was the third in NFL history after Fritz Pollard in the 1920s and Shell.

Through his first six years with the team, Green never posted a losing record and the team failed to qualify for the playoffs only once. Green was reportedly the pioneer of using the team's day off on Tuesday to do charity work in the community, which eventually became common in the NFL. Initially, Green earned widespread praise for turning around what had recently been a lackluster franchise. However, as the team's fan-base grew accustomed to regular season success, Green came under criticism for failing to advance the team deeper into the playoffs.

In 1996, two members of the Vikings' ownership board, Wheelock Whitney and Jane Dyer, reportedly contacted Lou Holtz, who was the coach of the Notre Dame Fighting Irish football team and former coach of the Minnesota Golden Gophers football team. They wanted to bring Holtz in to replace Green. Holtz abruptly announced his retirement in 1996, and rumors surrounded the reasons, one of which was the possible Vikings head coaching position.

In 1997, Green published his autobiography No Room For Crybabies, in which he responded to the criticism and perceived personal vendettas by Twin Cities sports writers Bob Sansevere, Dan Barreiro, and Patrick Reusse. He threatened to sue the team as his response to the Lou Holtz rumors.

The high point of Green's Vikings career was the 1998 season, when the team went 15–1 and set the NFL record for the most points scored in a season (a record since broken by the 2013 Denver Broncos under John Fox). The Vikings advanced to the NFC Championship game, losing to the Atlanta Falcons after Atlanta's Morten Andersen made a field goal in overtime, which was made possible by Vikings kicker Gary Anderson missing a field goal of his own earlier in the game.

In 2001, the Vikings finished with a losing record for the first time in Green's decade with the team. The Vikings bought out Green's contract on January 4, 2002. Assistant coach Mike Tice led the team in their final regular season game against the Baltimore Ravens, and was eventually hired as the head coach.

Arizona Cardinals
After spending two seasons as an analyst for ESPN, Green was hired as head coach by the Arizona Cardinals on January 7, 2004. Through his first two years with the team, Green totaled 11 wins with the Cardinals and finished 3rd in the NFC West, an improvement over predecessor Dave McGinnis. Unlike his previous two seasons, the 2006 season began with great expectations for the Cardinals with the opening of a new stadium, sellout crowds, the drafting of quarterback Matt Leinart, and the signing of Pro Bowl running back Edgerrin James. After a solid start, the Cardinals suffered some tough early losses.

"They are who we thought they were!" 

The worst of these came in a Monday Night Football game on October 16, 2006, losing a 20-point lead to the Chicago Bears in less than twenty minutes. Asked about how Chicago's tenacious defense forced six turnovers and shut down the Arizona offense, the normally soft-spoken Green unloaded from the lectern:

The day after the press conference, offensive coordinator Keith Rowen was fired and replaced with quarterbacks coach Mike Kruczek. Although Green later apologized for the outburst, and the Cardinals rallied to win four of their last seven games, including a rare win over playoff-bound Seattle, many pundits felt that the loss to Chicago and ensuing tirade had already sealed Green's fate. On January 1, 2007, the Cardinals fired Green with a year left on his contract.

Green's tirade is still used heavily in NFL media coverage today, often comically, to describe the obvious flaws of an opponent and the failure to capitalize on that knowledge.  It was featured in a Coors TV advertisement.

In August 2007, the Westwood One radio network announced that it had hired Green to serve as a color analyst on their Thursday night NFL broadcasts.

California Redwoods
On March 11, 2009, it was announced that Green would be the head coach of the San Francisco franchise for the United Football League's inaugural season.

Green's first game as California Redwoods coach was a 30–17 loss to the Las Vegas Locomotives.

Sacramento Mountain Lions
Beginning with the 2010 season, the Redwoods moved to Sacramento and were renamed the Mountain Lions. Green remained as head coach for the 2011 seasons as well, his final season with the Mountain Lions. After leaving the team, Green sued the league for lack of payment on a $1.5 million contract for the 2011 season.  (The United Football League suspended play in October 2012 amid lawsuits alleging unpaid debts.) An arbitrator awarded Green $990,000 for the 2011 season, and the award was upheld in February 2014 by a San Francisco Superior Court judge.

Death

On Thursday July 21, 2016, Green died at the age of 67 due to complications from cardiac arrest. He was survived by his four children.

After his death, the Vikings team released a statement saying, "He mentored countless players and served as a father figure for the men he coached.  He took great pride in helping assistant coaches advance their careers. His tenure as one of the first African American head coaches in both college and the NFL was also transformative. Our thoughts and prayers are with the entire Green family."

Head coaching record

College

NFL

*Only coached 15 games

United Football League

See also
 List of National Football League head coaches with 50 wins

References

External links

 
 
 
 

1949 births
2016 deaths
American football running backs
Arizona Cardinals head coaches
BC Lions players
Dayton Flyers football coaches
Iowa Hawkeyes football coaches
Iowa Hawkeyes football players
Minnesota Vikings head coaches
Northwestern Wildcats football coaches
Sacramento Mountain Lions coaches
San Francisco 49ers coaches
Stanford Cardinal football coaches
National Football League announcers
United Football League (2009–2012) head coaches
Sportspeople from Harrisburg, Pennsylvania
Players of American football from Harrisburg, Pennsylvania
African-American coaches of American football
African-American players of American football
African-American players of Canadian football
Educators from Pennsylvania
Educators from Ohio
20th-century African-American sportspeople
21st-century African-American people